The 1960 New Hampshire gubernatorial election was held on November 8, 1960. Incumbent Republican Wesley Powell defeated Democratic nominee Bernard L. Boutin with 55.46% of the vote.

Primary elections
Primary elections were held on September 13, 1960.

Candidates 
Bernard L. Boutin, former Mayor of Laconia
John Shaw
Robert W. Watson

Results

Republican primary

Candidates
Wesley Powell, incumbent Governor
Hugh Gregg, former Governor
Wayne Crosby

Results

General election

Candidates
Wesley Powell, Republican
Bernard L. Boutin, Democratic

Results

References

1960
New Hampshire
Gubernatorial